Union Station is an unincorporated community in Licking County, in the U.S. state of Ohio.

History
Union Station had its start as a railroad station in Union Township. A post office was established at Union Station in 1869, and remained in operation until 1918.

References

Unincorporated communities in Licking County, Ohio
1869 establishments in Ohio
Populated places established in 1869
Unincorporated communities in Ohio